"A Town Called Hypocrisy" is the second single taken from Liberation Transmission, the third studio album by the Welsh alternative rock band Lostprophets.

The single was released on 11 September 2006 in the United Kingdom. It peaked at No. 23 in the UK Singles Chart making it the band's seventh UK Top 40 single. It spent only 2 weeks in the Top 40.

Music video
The music video was made available on Kerrang! TV from the 11 August 2006. It depicts frontman Ian Watkins as a children's television presenter on a fictional television show called Town Time and is arguably a response to the accusations of the band's metrosexuality. The video also shows the juxtaposition of attitudes in the band between when they appear during transmission and when they are shown behind the scenes of Town Time. During transmission, it shows the other band members — bar Watkins — dressed as the following (mainly paying homage to the Village People): a toy soldier, a bumbling policeman, a doctor, a builder and a construction worker.

The video, although seemingly based around the things infant children watch (therefore making it seem quite innocent) is filled with sexual references, both very subtle and very obvious. An example of the more subtle references is at the beginning when we see Tender Tim (Watkins) and Mayor Mary ending the 5000th episode of Town Time. Tim replies to Mary's question, "What have we learnt today, Tim?"and Tim replies: "We've learnt about sharing, saying 'please' and oral [he pauses here, before Mary nudges him] hygiene."
An example of the more obvious references is the large amounts of drinking and scantily clad women (dressed in all sorts of outfits, ranging from animals to a tooth) performing "kinky," yet childlike, activities on the men in the group behind the scenes.

In several frames of the video, it also paid homage to 'Silhouette Blends', the series of spelling clips by The Electric Company. It is the first video by the band not to feature skaters.

Track listing

Personnel
Musicians
 Ian Watkins – lead vocals
 Jamie Oliver – piano; keyboard; samples; vocals
 Lee Gaze – lead guitar
 Mike Lewis – rhythm guitar
 Stuart Richardson – bass guitar
 Josh Freese – drums; percussion 
 Ilan Rubin – drums; percussion

Release history

Chart positions

References

External links

Lostprophets songs
2006 singles
Music videos directed by Brett Simon
Song recordings produced by Bob Rock
2006 songs
Columbia Records singles